Cicadas of New Zealand consist of Cicadidae recorded from the islands of New Zealand. The morphological taxonomy of cicadas present in New Zealand is regarded as being in its infancy. As a result, this list is likely to be subject to change.

Amphipsalta 
 
 Amphipsalta cingulata (Fabricius, 1775), Clapping Cicada
 Amphipsalta strepitans (Kirkaldy, 1909), Chirping Cicada
 Amphipsalta zelandica (Boisduval, 1835), Chorus Cicada

Kikihia 

 Kikihia angusta (Walker, 1850), Tussock Cicada
 Kikihia cauta (Myers, 1921), Greater Bronze Cicada
 Kikihia cutora cumberi Fleming, 1973, Southern Snoring Cicada
 Kikihia cutora cutora (Walker, 1850), Northern Snoring Cicada
 Kikihia cutora exulis (Hudson, 1950), Kermadec Cicada
 Kikihia dugdalei Fleming, 1984, Dugdale's Cicada
 Kikihia horologium Fleming, 1984, Clock Cicada
 Kikihia laneorum Fleming, 1984, Lane's Cicada
 Kikihia longula (Hudson, 1950), Chathams Cicada 
 Kikihia muta muta (Fabricius, 1775), Variable Cicada
 Kikihia muta pallida (Hudson, 1950)
 Kikihia ochrina (Walker, 1858), April Green Cicada
 Kikihia paxillulae Fleming, 1984, Peg's Cicada
 Kikihia rosea (Walker, 1850), Pink or Murihiku Cicada
 Kikihia scutellaris (Walker, 1850), Lesser Bronze Cicada
 Kikihia subalpina (Hudson, 1891), Subalpine Green Cicada

Maoricicada 

 Maoricicada alticola Dugdale & Fleming, 1978, High Alpine Cicada
 Maoricicada campbelli (Myers, 1923), Campbell's Cicada
 Maoricicada cassiope (Hudson, 1891), Screaming Cicada
 Maoricicada clamitans Dugdale & Fleming, 1978, Yodelling Cicada
 Maoricicada hamiltoni (Myers, 1926), Hamilton's Cicada
 Maoricicada iolanthe (Hudson, 1891), Iolanthe Cicada
 Maoricicada lindsayi (Myers, 1923), Linsay's Cicada
 Maoricicada mangu celer Dugdale & Fleming, 1978, Braying Cicada
 Maoricicada mangu gourlayi Dugdale & Fleming, 1978, Dun Mountain Cicada
 Maoricicada mangu mangu (White, 1879), Canterbury Scree Cicada
 Maoricicada mangu multicostata Dugdale & Fleming, 1978, Northern Scree Cicada
 Maoricicada myersi (Fleming, 1971), Myers' Cicada
 Maoricicada nigra frigida Dugdale & Fleming, 1978, Eastern Subnival Cicada
 Maoricicada nigra nigra (Myers, 1921), Western Subnival Cicada
 Maoricicada oromelaena (Myers, 1926), Greater Alpine Black Cicada
 Maoricicada otagoensis maceweni Dugdale & Fleming, 1978, Southern Speargrass Cicada
 Maoricicada otagoensis otagoensis Dugdale & Fleming, 1978, Otago Speargrass Cicada
 Maoricicada phaeoptera Dugdale & Fleming, 1978, Southern Dusky Cicada
 Maoricicada tenuis Dugdale & Fleming, 1978, Northern Dusky Cicada

Notopsalta 

 Notopsalta sericea (Walker, 1850), Clay Bank Cicada

Rhodopsalta 

 Rhodopsalta cruentata (Fabricius, 1775), Blood Redtail Cicada
 Rhodopsalta leptomera (Myers, 1921), Sand Dune Redtail Cicada
 Rhodopsalta microdora (Hudson, 1936), Little Redtail Cicada

References

External links
 Identification guide for New Zealand cicadas
 Field notes and photographs of New Zealand cicadas
 Virtual collection of type specimens held by NZAC

 
New Zealand